Mandoli may refer to:

Heather Mandoli (born 1982), Canadian rower
Mandoli, Bhiwani, village in Bhiwani district, Haryana
Mandoli, Delhi, census town in North East Delhi
Mandoli, Rajasthan, village in Jalore district
a variant of the game of mancala

See also
Battle of Maonda and Mandholi, Rajasthan (1767)
Mandholi, a town in Rajasthan